Five Aces is a 1999 black comedy/drama film written, produced and directed by David Michael O'Neill. It stars Charlie Sheen, Christopher McDonald, Aimée Leigh, Jeff Cesario, Michael McGrady, Tia Carrere, Geoffrey Lewis, Virginia Hamilton, Matt Clark, Hannes Jaenicke with John LaMotta and Elizabeth Morehead. It is one of the films where Charlie Sheen is credited as Charles Sheen.

The film released direct-to-video in many countries.

Plot
Chris Martin (Charlie Sheen) is a bachelor who wants to marry his long-time girlfriend. Wanting to enjoy his last few days as a bachelor, Chris spends several nights hanging out with his old friends, as they drink, swap stories, and chase women. What began as a send-off, however, might be something more serious when Martin starts having second thoughts about matrimony.

External links
 
 

1999 films
American black comedy films
1999 comedy-drama films
1990s English-language films
1990s American films